Sephton is a surname. Notable people with the surname include:

Alfred Edward Sephton (1911–1941), British Royal Navy sailor and Victoria Cross recipient
Arthur Sephton (1894-1982), British Anglican priest
Colin Sephton (born 1945), British sport shooter
Henry Sephton (–1756), English architect